This list of journalism awards is an index to articles about notable awards for journalism. It is organized by the region and country of the organization that sponsors the award, although some awards are not limited to one country.

International

 The Elizabeth Neuffer Memorial Prize
 The Prince Albert II of Monaco and UNCA Global Prize
 Online Journalism Awards, administered by Online News Association
 UNESCO/Guillermo Cano World Press Freedom Prize
 World Association of Newspapers' Golden Pen of Freedom Award

Africa

 Nigeria : Nigerian Academy of Science Media Awards
 South Africa : Nat Nakasa Award for Media Integrity
 South Africa : Taco Kuiper Award for Investigative Journalism

Americas

Canada

 Charles Lynch Award
 Critics and Awards Program for High School Students
 Yves Fortier Earth Science Journalism Award
 Gordon Sinclair Award
 Jack Graney Award
 Jack Webster Awards
 Michener Award
 National Media Awards Foundation
 National Newspaper Awards
 Olivar-Asselin Award

United States

Latin America

 Brazil : Esso Journalism Award
 Brazil : Vladimir Herzog Award
 Chile : Lenka Franulic Award
 Chile : National Prize for Journalism
 Ecuador : Jorge Mantilla Ortega Prize
 Uruguay : Marcelo Jelen Award

Asia

 Bangladesh : Babisas Award
 Hong Kong : Hong Kong Human Rights Press Awards
 India : Bharatendu Harishchandra Awards
 India : Chameli Devi Jain Award for Outstanding Women Mediapersons
 India : Ramnath Goenka Excellence in Journalism Awards
 India : Siva Prasad Barooah National Award
 Israel : Sokolov Award
 Japan : Editors' Choice Magazine Journalism Award
 Pakistan : Agahi Award
 Pakistan : Pride of the Nation Gold Medal Awards
 Philippines : National Schools Press Conference
 Philippines : Ramon Magsaysay Award
 Thailand : Sriburapha Award 
 Turkey : Metin Göktepe Journalism Awards
 Turkey : Sedat Simavi Journalism Award
 UAE : Arab Journalism Award

Europe

 Europe : European Initiative Prize
 Europe : European Newspaper Award
 Europe : European Press Prize
 Europe : Lorenzo Natali Journalism Prize
 Croatia : Otokar Keršovani Prize
 Denmark : Cavling Prize 
 France : Albert Londres Prize
 France : Bayeux-Calvados Awards for war correspondents
 Ireland : National Student Media Awards
 Italy : Ischia International Journalism Award
 Italy : Premiolino
 Netherlands : Anne Vondeling prize
 Netherlands : Pop Media Award
 Norway : International Reporter
 Norway : Narvesen Prize
 Norway : SKUP Award
 Poland : Golden Pear
 Spain : Ortega y Gasset Awards
 Sweden : Guldspaden
 Sweden : Per Wendel Award
 Sweden : Stora Journalistpriset
 Sweden : Swedish Publicists' Association
 Sweden : WASH Media Award
 Sweden : Åke Blomström Award
 Turkey : Istanbul Photo Awards

Germany

 Axel-Springer-Preis
 Ernst-Schneider-Preis
 Felix-Rexhausen Award
 Gerhard Löwenthal Prize
 Hanns Joachim Friedrichs Award
 Lettre Ulysses Award 
 The BOBs (weblog award)
 Theodor Wolff Prize
 Wächterpreis der Tagespresse

United Kingdom

Oceania

Australia

 Arthur Lovekin Prize in Journalism
 Eureka Prizes
 Gold Walkley
 Graham Perkin Australian Journalist of the Year Award
 John Douglas Pringle Award
 Multicultural and Indigenous Media Awards
 Nikon-Walkley Australian Press Photographer of the Year
 Pascall Prize
 Queensland Media Awards
 Sport Australia Media Awards
 Stanley Award
 The Ledger Awards
 WA Media Awards
 Walkley Awards 
 Walkley Award for Broadcast Interviewing
 Walkley Award for Journalism Leadership
 Walkley Award for Most Outstanding Contribution to Journalism
 Young Australian Journalist of the Year

Photojournalism

 Atrium Award
 Democracy Photo Challenge
 Gruner + Jahr
 Local Testimony
 Pictures of the Year International
 Prix Nadar
 Pulitzer Prize for Breaking News Photography
 Pulitzer Prize for Feature Photography
 Pulitzer Prize for Photography
 Robert Capa Gold Medal
 Visa pour l'Image
 W. Eugene Smith Memorial Fund

See also

 Lists of awards
 List of science communication awards
 List of sports journalism awards

References

 
 Journalism